"Keep Them Kisses Comin'" is a song recorded by American country music artist Craig Campbell. It was released in December 2013 as the second single from his second studio album, Never Regret. The song was written by Dallas Davidson and Ben Hayslip.

Music video
The music video was directed by Shea Windley and premiered in May 2014.

Chart performance
"Keep Them Kisses Comin'" debuted at number 54 on the U.S. Billboard Country Airplay chart for the week of December 28, 2013, and at number 40 on the U.S. Billboard Hot Country Songs chart for the week of March 8, 2014. It also debuted at number 99 on the U.S. Billboard Hot 100 chart for the week of May 17, 2014. It became Campbell's highest charting single in April 2014, becoming his first Top Ten hit. As of July 2014, the song has sold 244,000 copies in the U.S.

Year-end charts

References

Songs about kissing
2013 songs
2013 singles
Craig Campbell (singer) songs
Bigger Picture Music Group singles
Songs written by Dallas Davidson
Songs written by Ben Hayslip
Song recordings produced by Keith Stegall